Planet 13 Holdings, Inc. is a cannabis company based in Nevada, United States. On Nov 1, 2018, the   company opened its cannabis dispensary in Las Vegas which became the largest cannabis dispensary in the world at 112,000 square feet.

The company operates through Planet 13 Cannabis Superstore & Entertainment Complex as well other sub-brands like Medizin, Trendi, Leaf & Vine, PURC and Planet M. The product portfolio of the brands are primarily cannabis products while PURC is a coffee brand.

The company has expanded across the United States and have dispensaries in Orange County, California, Florida, and Illinois.

History 
Planet 13 Holdings is run by its two CEOs Bob Groesbeck and Larry Scheffler, who are both former politicians. Groesbeck served as the mayor of Henderson, 16 miles away from Las Vegas, from 1993 to 1997, and Scheffler served as a councilman for Henderson.

The company has a cultivation license in Nevada with a capacity of 950 kg per year. It also has two retail licenses to sell both medical and recreational cannabis.

In 2021, Planet 13 Holdings purchased a medical marijuana subsidiary of Harvest Health and Recreation for $55 million. The store will be known at Planet 13 Florida. In 2022, the company purchased Next Green Wave to expand operations in California.

In July 2021, the company opened Planet 13 Orange County in Santa Ana, California. The largest dispensary in California, it features an 89-foot digital waterfall, a computerized interactive beach, and a 16-foot octopus sculpture.

Planet 13 Cannabis Dispensary 
The company has a  retail outlet near the Las Vegas Strip is the largest cannabis dispensary in the world measured by square footage at 40,000. It serves an average of 3,575 customers per day. It is open 24 hours seven days a week.

Market and Expansion 
The company's share price had more than doubled in one year, up to 175%. The share price has also increased up to 48% in a quarter. With a market capital of C$510 million, the company  reported sales of $5.5 million in March 2019, a 64% increase from the time of opening of the dispensary in November 2018. Based on the same, the annual sales figures are expected to be around $66 million as estimated by Seeking Alpha. The company stock performed well in 2019 with a reported 113% gain until April 2019. On July 1st 2021, Planet 13 opened a 40,000-square-foot store in Santa Ana, Calif., just 10 minutes from Disneyland.

References 

Medicinal use of cannabis
Cannabis companies of the United States
Health care companies based in Nevada
Cannabis dispensaries in the United States
Recreational drug tourism